Ryan Graves (born May 21, 1995) is a Canadian professional ice hockey defenceman for the New Jersey Devils of the National Hockey League (NHL). Graves was selected by the New York Rangers, 110th overall, in the 2013 NHL Entry Draft. He has previously played for the Colorado Avalanche.

Early life 
Graves was born on May 21, 1995, in Yarmouth, Nova Scotia, to Ron Graves and Monica Brennan. He was childhood friends with Nathan MacKinnon, another Nova Scotia native, and the two would play youth ice hockey against each other on local teams and together on regional teams. Graves had a reputation in the Nova Scotia youth hockey circuit for clumsiness, caused primarily by his comparatively tall physique. His strength and shot-blocking abilities, however, drew praise from coaches in the Yarmouth County Minor Hockey Association. During the 2010-11 minor ice hockey season, Graves played for the South Shore Canadian Tire Mustangs, for whom he scored five goals and recorded seven assists. In addition to being named the team's top rookie, he was given the Scott Dee Memorial Award for the best rookie defenceman in the Nova Scotia Major Midget Hockey League. That same year, he made one appearance with the Yarmouth Mariners of the Maritime Junior Hockey League.

Playing career

Junior
The Prince Edward Island Rocket of the Quebec Major Junior Hockey League (QMJHL) selected Graves in the first round, ninth overall, of the 2011 QMJHL Entry Draft. As a rookie during the 2011–12 season, Graves had two goals and seven assists for a total of nine points, as well as 34 penalty minutes. The Rocket, meanwhile, finished in last place in the league with a 19–43–2–4 record and missed the postseason for the first time in seven years. Graves said after his rookie season that he had difficulty adjusting from minor to junior ice hockey, and his improved confidence in the 2012–13 season was due to his greater familiarity with the league, increased playing time as a second-year skater, and his ability to learn from older teammates. He also practiced three times a week with a Newfoundland skating coach that helped to improve the coordination issues that had followed him from adolescence.

After improving his offensive output in the following 2012–13 season, Graves gained the eye of NHL scouts, and was later selected in the fourth round, 110th overall, by the New York Rangers in the 2013 NHL Entry Draft.

The Rocket were rebranded as the Charlottetown Islanders for the 2013–14 season. In collecting 12 points in 39 games, Graves was dealt by the Islanders to the Val-d'Or Foreurs for their post-season push. He helped the Foreurs in the playoffs with 8 points in 24 games to help the club claim the President's Cup. On March 17, 2014, Graves' progression was rewarded as he was signed to a three-year, entry-level contract with the Rangers.

Prior to the 2014–15 season, Graves was again on the move in the QMJHL, traded by the Foreurs to the Quebec Remparts in exchange for Vincent Lanoue and draft picks on August 18, 2014. An assistant captain, Graves broke out offensively in his final junior season, contributing with a career-high 15 goals and 24 assists for 39 points in just 50 games. He was selected to the Canadian Hockey League's Memorial Cup All-Star Team after collecting 5 points in 5 games for host club Quebec.

Professional

New York Rangers organization (2015–18) 

In the 2015–16 season, Graves was assigned to the Rangers AHL affiliate, the Hartford Wolf Pack. He made his professional debut on opening night against the St. John's IceCaps on October 10, 2015. He collected his first goal and assist in a 4–3 victory over the Syracuse Crunch on October 23, 2015. As a hulking defenceman with good mobility, Graves was a staple on the blueline for the Wolf Pack and represented the club at the 2016 AHL All-Star Game, winning the hardest shot contest with a 103.4 m/ph slapshot. With the Wolf Pack finishing out of playoff contention, Graves finished the season, leading the blueline with 9 goals in his 21 points in 74 games.

In the following 2016–17 season, Graves continued his upward development in leading the blueline in all scoring categories with 8 goals, 22 assists and 30 points. Assigned to the Wolf Pack for the final year of his rookie contract, Graves regressed with just 4 goals and 11 points in 57 games in the 2017–18 season.

Colorado Avalanche (2018–21) 
Graves was dealt by the New York Rangers at the trade deadline to the Colorado Avalanche in exchange for Chris Bigras on February 26, 2018. He was immediately assigned to the Avalanche's AHL affiliate, the San Antonio Rampage.

On July 17, he was re-signed to a one-year contract by the Avalanche. In the  season, Graves scored his first NHL goal on January 4, 2019, against the team that drafted him, the New York Rangers. On July 8, Graves was re-signed to a one-year contract. During the 2019–20 season, primarily playing alongside eventual Calder Memorial Trophy winner Cale Makar, Graves in a top-pairing role scored career highs in both goals and points, and lead the NHL in the plus–minus statistic at +40. On October 12, 2020, Graves signed a three-year, $9.5 million contract with the Avalanche.

In the pandemic delayed  season, Graves made his 100th NHL appearance in a 3–2 overtime victory over the Anaheim Ducks on January 22, 2021. Used in a top-four role, Graves was relied upon as the mainstay of the Avalanche penalty kill, finishing third in the league in short-handed time on ice. He registered 2 goals and 15 points in appearing in 54 of 56 regular season games.

New Jersey Devils (2021–present) 
On July 15, 2021, due to impending expansion draft considerations, Graves was traded by Avalanche to the New Jersey Devils in exchange for Mikhail Maltsev and a second-round pick in the 2021 NHL Entry Draft.

Career statistics

Regular season and playoffs

International

Awards and honours

References

External links
 

1995 births
Canadian ice hockey defencemen
Charlottetown Islanders players
Colorado Avalanche players
Colorado Eagles players
Hartford Wolf Pack players
Ice hockey people from Nova Scotia
Living people
New Jersey Devils players
New York Rangers draft picks
P.E.I. Rocket players
People from Yarmouth, Nova Scotia
Quebec Remparts players
San Antonio Rampage players
Val-d'Or Foreurs players